Gombe-Matadi is a community in Kongo Central Province, Democratic Republic of the Congo (DRC).

References

http://www.gomapper.com/travel/where-is/gombe-matadi-located.html

Populated places in Kongo Central